The Fourmyula were a New Zealand rock group formed in 1967 in Upper Hutt. They achieved considerable local success in the late 1960s, with ten of their fourteen singles reaching the New Zealand Top 20.

Career (1967–1971)

The group initially consisted of Wayne Mason (guitar, keyboards, vocals), Martin Hope (guitar and vocals), Ali Richardson (bass and vocals), and Chris Parry (drums), who founded Fiction Records (UK) in 1978. They were joined in 1968 by Carl Evensen as lead vocalist.

Their first release, "Come With Me" made it to number 2 in August 1968. They released fourteen singles (ten of which reached the New Zealand Top 20) and five albums and won the New Zealand Entertainers of the Year award in 1970.

The Fourmyula's best known song, "Nature", written by Wayne Mason and produced by Peter Dawkins, reached number one in the New Zealand charts in December 1969. It won the APRA Silver Scroll Award for the year. The Mutton Birds released a rockier version of "Nature" in 1995, and in 2001 the original version was voted New Zealand's greatest pop song ever - becoming the title track of the best-selling Nature's Best compilation.

Reunion (2010)

In 2010 the band reformed to promote the compilation The Complete Fourmyula, a 4-CD set which includes a previously unreleased album Turn Your Back on the Wind, originally recorded for Decca. They played two concerts, one in Auckland on 18 February 2010 and another in Upper Hutt, on 20 March 2010.

The Fourmyula was inducted into the New Zealand Music Hall of Fame at the 2010 APRA Silver Scroll Awards.

Discography

Studio albums

Live albums

Compilation albums

Extended Plays

Singles

Awards and nominations

Aotearoa Music Awards
The Aotearoa Music Awards (previously known as New Zealand Music Awards (NZMA)) are an annual awards night celebrating excellence in New Zealand music and have been presented annually since 1965.

! 
|-
| 1968 || "Alice Is There" || Single of the Year ||  ||rowspan="2"| 
|-
| 1970 || "Nature" || Single of the Year ||  
|-
| 2010 || The Fourmyula || New Zealand Music Hall of Fame ||  || 
|-

See also 

Nature's Best

References

External links 
 The Fourmyula profile at AudioCulture
 Collection of band associate Les Gruebner's Fourmyula recordings at the Alexander Turnbull Library

APRA Award winners
New Zealand rock music groups